Ahn Young-kyu ; is a South Korean football player who plays for Gwangju FC.

References

External links

Living people
1989 births
South Korean footballers
South Korean expatriate footballers
Suwon Samsung Bluewings players
Giravanz Kitakyushu players
Daejeon Hana Citizen FC players
Gwangju FC players
Asan Mugunghwa FC players
K League 1 players
K League 2 players
K League 2 Most Valuable Player Award winners
J2 League players
Expatriate footballers in Japan
South Korean expatriate sportspeople in Japan
Association football midfielders